Kusu or KUSU may refer to:

 Kusu, Mie, a former town in Mie Prefecture, Japan
 Kusu, Ōita, a town in Ōita Prefecture, Japan
 Kusu District, Ōita, a district in Ōita Prefecture, Japan
 Kusu Station, a railway station in Japan
 , a patrol frigate of the Japan Maritime Self-Defense Force
 Kusu Island, an island in Singapore
 KUSU-FM, a radio station in Logan, Utah, United States
 KUSU-TV, a former television station in Logan, Utah, United States
 Keele University Students' Union, a university students' union at Keele University, United Kingdom
 Kusu (goddess), a Mesopotamian deity associated with purification
 Kusu, an aged awamori, a drink native to Okinawa, Japan

See also 
 Kusunoki (disambiguation)